= Laion (footballer) =

Brazilian footballer

Personal information
- Full name: Laion Ferreira Gomes
- Date of birth: February 4, 1988 (age 38)
- Place of birth: Florianópolis, Brazil
- Height: 1.76 m (5 ft 9 in)
- Position: Right-back

Youth career
- 2005: Figueirense

Senior career*
Years	Team	Apps	(Gls)
2006–2007	Figueirense		
- * Club domestic league appearances and goals

Laion Ferreira Gomes (born February 4, 1988, in Florianópolis), or simply Laion, is a Brazilian former footballer who played as a right-back for Figueirense.
